This is a list of Australian television-related events, debuts, finales, and cancellations that are scheduled to occur in 2022, the 67th year of continuous operation of television in Australia.

Events

January

February

March

June

July

Premieres

Domestic series

Programming changes

Changes to network affiliation
Criterion for inclusion in the following list is that Australian premiere episodes will air in Australia for the first time on a new channel. This includes when a program is moved from a free-to-air network's primary channel to a digital multi-channel, as well as when a program moves between subscription television channels – provided the preceding criterion is met. Ended television series which change networks for repeat broadcasts are not included in the list.

Free-to-air premieres
This is a list of programs which made their premiere on Australian free-to-air television that had previously premiered on Australian subscription television. Programs may still air on the original subscription television network.

Subscription premieres
This is a list of programs which made their debut on Australian subscription television, having previously premiered on Australian free-to-air television. Programs may still air (first or repeat) on the original free-to-air television network.

Returning programs
Australian produced programs which are returning with a new season after being absent from television from the previous calendar year.

Endings

Deaths

References

2022 in Australian television